Papord is a small village in the Beohari block, Shahdol district in Madhya Pradesh, India. Papord village is the single gram panchayat and biggest single gram panchayat village of Beohari block. Papord has 1,546 voters.

Villages in Shahdol district